Andrew Monroe Rice (born April 23, 1973) is an American civic leader and politician from Oklahoma. He represented Senate District 46 in the Oklahoma State Senate. He was the Democratic Party's nominee for the United States Senate in 2008, losing to incumbent U.S. Senator Jim Inhofe.

Rice worked as Foundation Fundraising Director of Variety Care health systems in Central Oklahoma, a non-profit group which serves moderate income families with health care.

He resigned from his Senate seat January 15, 2012, citing an out-of-state career opportunity for his wife.

In 2020, Rice published a novel, Ghosts of Ursino, and a collection of poems, Luminosity.

Early life
Born and raised in Oklahoma City, Rice attended Casady School and graduated from Christchurch School. In 1996, he graduated from Colby College with a bachelor's degree in Religious Studies and in 1999 he earned his masters in Theological Studies from Harvard Divinity School in Cambridge, Massachusetts.

From 1996 to 1997 Rice studied drug addiction problems and treatment in urban India. During graduate school, Rice produced a documentary entitled From Ashes which focused on the AIDS epidemic in India.

In 2001, Rice's brother, David Harlow Rice, died in the September 11, 2001 attacks.

State Senate
After winning the Democratic party's three-way primary for Senate district 46 on July 25, 2006, Rice won the general election garnering 69.5 percent of the vote. He was sworn into office on November 16, 2006.

Rice's Senate district encompasses downtown and the urban core of Oklahoma City and covers approximately 71,000 people.

In 2010, Rice was re-elected to the Oklahoma State Senate with 68 percent of the vote. For the 2011 & 2012 legislation sessions, Rice was elected by his colleagues to serve as the Senate Democratic Leader making him the highest ranking Democrat in state government.

On October 18, 2011, Rice announced his resignation effective January 15, 2012, citing an out-of-state career opportunity for his wife.

Sponsored Legislation
*Cosponsored and helped pass legislation called the "All Kids Act" to add 38,000 Oklahoma children to those eligible for government-sponsored health insurance.
Led a successful effort to make it easier for local governments to donate abandoned properties for use by Habitat for Humanity to construct affordable housing, especially in rural Oklahoma.
Co-author of the legislation creating the Hunger Task Force to tackle the problem of hunger in Oklahoma.
Authored legislation creating a state Veterans Health Insurance Program that provides coverage to uninsured Oklahoma veterans. The legislation was passed by the senate with  45–1 vote.

2008 U.S. Senate Election

Rice officially filed as a candidate for the United States Senate from Oklahoma on Monday, June 2, 2008. He won the Democratic primary against Jim Rogers on July 29, 2008 but was defeated in the general election on November 4, 2008 by incumbent Republican Jim Inhofe, who won reelection to a fourth term in a landslide.

Personal
In 2004, Rice founded of the Progressive Alliance Foundation which worked throughout the state of Oklahoma advancing progressive, fair-minded and constitutional solutions to public policy problems. He also launched the Red River Democracy Project and was on the board of The People's Opinion Project. For 3 years, Rice was the Executive Director of Teen Recovery Solutions in Oklahoma City, which operates Oklahoma's only accredited recovery High School for teens dealing with addiction, Mission Academy. On September 11, 2001, Rice lost a brother in the 9/11 attacks.

Rice is also a writer. He has published a novel, Ghosts of Ursino, and a collection of poems, Luminosity.

Rice is married to Dr. Apple Newman Rice who practices medicine in Oklahoma City. They have two sons and reside in Oklahoma City.

Electoral history

References

External links
Senator Andrew Rice at the Oklahoma State Senate
Andrew Rice for U.S. Senate official campaign website
 
Campaign contributions at OpenSecrets.org

Democratic Party Oklahoma state senators
Politicians from Oklahoma City
1973 births
Living people
Colby College alumni
Harvard Divinity School alumni
21st-century American politicians